Saint-Michel Basilica-Cathedral is a Roman Catholic minor basilica and cathedral dedicated to St. Michael located in Sherbrooke, Quebec, Canada. The church is the seat of the Roman Catholic Archdiocese of Sherbrooke. The basilica was decreed on July 31, 1959. The lower-half of the cathedral was constructed from 1914 to 1917. A lack of funds resulted in a thirty-nine year pause in construction. The completion of the upper-half of the cathedral was in 1956 to 1957.

The cathedral was designed by architect Louis-Napoleon Audet, in Gothic style. Mr Audet was the architect for both phases of construction.
The large window of the façade depicts the four Evangelists. The Cathedral of St Michael has 105 stained-glass windows crafted by Rafaël Lardeur of Paris.

The archbishop's chapel was painted by Ozias Leduc.

References

External links

 Roman Catholic Archdiocese of Sherbrooke

Buildings and structures in Sherbrooke
Roman Catholic cathedrals in Quebec
20th-century Roman Catholic church buildings in Canada
Roman Catholic churches completed in 1959
Gothic Revival church buildings in Canada
Tourist attractions in Estrie